Cefozopran (INN) is a fourth-generation cephalosporin.

Spectrum of bacterial susceptibility and resistance
Most of the strains of  Stenotrophomonas maltophilia have developed resistance toward cefozopran.

References 

Cephalosporin antibiotics
Thiadiazoles
Ketoximes